Thomas Dinsley (born 25 June 1941) is a Canadian former diver, born in Regina, Saskatchewan, who competed in the 1964 Summer Olympics.

References

External links
 Thomas Dinsley at Canadian Olympic Team

1941 births
Living people
Sportspeople from Regina, Saskatchewan
Olympic divers of Canada
Divers at the 1964 Summer Olympics
Canadian male divers
Divers at the 1962 British Empire and Commonwealth Games
Commonwealth Games medallists in diving
Commonwealth Games silver medallists for Canada
Divers at the 1963 Pan American Games
Pan American Games medalists in diving
Pan American Games gold medalists for Canada
Medalists at the 1963 Pan American Games
Medallists at the 1962 British Empire and Commonwealth Games